An overhang is a rock face or artificial climbing wall with a slope of more than 90°, i.e. it slopes beyond the vertical. Particularly severe overhangs that reach, or nearly reach, the horizontal, are referred to as a roof.

In climbing, overhangs and especially roofs place special demands both in terms of technique and equipment as well as the constitution of the climber. With increasing steepness the loading on arm and hand muscles increases, because the feet can support less and less of the body weight. Rest points where the muscles can be relaxed, especially no-hands rests, are rarely found in overhangs. Climbing techniques to tackle overhangs include placing the body's centre of mass as close as possible to the rock and striving for the highest possible body tension. Many climbing techniques such as the foothook are almost exclusively used in overhangs and roofs. For a long time in Alpine climbing, roofs were almost always tacked using climbing aids. By contrast, in modern sport climbing, severely overhanging terrain is no longer a rarity, because climbing halls frequently include overhangs and roofs.

A well-known natural example of severely overhanging terrain is the rook in the north face of the Western Zinne, whose upper end is about 40 metres horizontally from the foot of the rock face. Severe climbing routes that feature overhangs and roofs include Separate Reality in the USA and La Rambla in Spain.

See also 
 Rock shelter
 Abri
 Mount Thor, the world's highest overhang

References 

Geomorphology
Climbing techniques